Morgan Branch (sometimes called Morgans Branch) is a stream in Scotland County in the U.S. state of Missouri. It is a tributary of the North Wyaconda River.

Morgan Branch has the name of Joseph K. Morgan, a pioneer citizen.

See also
List of rivers of Missouri

References

Rivers of Scotland County, Missouri
Rivers of Missouri